Charles Oula (born 12 January 1973) is a Monegasque bobsledder. He competed in the four man event at the 2002 Winter Olympics.

References

1973 births
Living people
Monegasque male bobsledders
Olympic bobsledders of Monaco
Bobsledders at the 2002 Winter Olympics
Sportspeople from Abidjan